Nanauta is a town and a nagar panchayat (municipality) in Saharanpur district in the Indian state of Uttar Pradesh. 
Nanauta is located on Saharanpur Delhi Highway.
The town is famous for its street food available in the Central Market and Clothes Market.

Demographics
, the Indian census recorded the population of Nanauta as 22,551. Males constitute 52.53% of the population and females 47.46%. Nanauta has an average literacy rate of 68.26%, lower than the national average of 74.04%: male literacy is 75.84%, and female literacy is 59.9%. In Nanauta, 14.51% of the population is under 6 years of age. Nanauta and the adjoining villages are home to the Ror and Rajput communities.

Education
Imam Bargah Sayyed Asad Ali Chatta
Gurudwara Girls School 
Kisan Sewak Inter College
Harsh Modern Public School
BSM Degree College
BSM Global School
Hukum Singh Girls Degree College
Green Field Academy
Bright Home Public School
Government Degree College (Rajkiya Mahavidhyalya)
Radiant Public School
Chander Sain Convent academy
Holy Home Public School

See also 
 Siddiqi family of Nanauta
 Nanautawi

References

Cities and towns in Saharanpur district